The 1988–89 NCAA Division I men's basketball season began in November 1988 and ended with the Final Four at the Kingdome in Seattle, Washington on April 3, 1989.

Season headlines 

 July 1, 1988 – the Pacific Coast Athletic Association changed its name to the Big West Conference.
 Loyola Marymount junior All-American Hank Gathers became the second player in NCAA Division I history to lead the nation in scoring (32.7) and rebounding (13.7) in the same season.

Major rule changes 
Beginning in 1988–89, the following rules changes were implemented:

Season outlook

Pre-season polls 

The top 20 from the AP Poll and Coaches Poll during the pre-season.

Regular season

Conference winners and tournaments

Statistical leaders

Conference standings

Postseason tournaments

NCAA tournament

Final Four - Kingdome, Seattle, Washington 

(* – Denotes Overtime)

National Invitation tournament

NIT Semifinals and Final

Award winners

Consensus All-American teams

Major player of the year awards 

 Wooden Award: Sean Elliott, Arizona
 Naismith Award: Danny Ferry, Duke
 Associated Press Player of the Year: Sean Elliott, Arizona
 UPI Player of the Year: Danny Ferry, Duke
 NABC Player of the Year: Sean Elliott, Arizona
 Oscar Robertson Trophy (USBWA): Danny Ferry, Duke
 Adolph Rupp Trophy: Sean Elliott, Arizona
 Sporting News Player of the Year: Stacey King, Oklahoma

Major freshman of the year awards 
 USBWA National Freshman of the Year: Chris Jackson, LSU

Major coach of the year awards 
 Associated Press Coach of the Year: Bob Knight, Indiana
 UPI Coach of the Year: Bob Knight, Indiana
 Henry Iba Award (USBWA): Bob Knight, Indiana
 NABC Coach of the Year: P. J. Carlesimo, Seton Hall
 Naismith College Coach of the Year: Mike Krzyzewski, Duke
 CBS/Chevrolet Coach of the Year: Lute Olson, Arizona
 Sporting News Coach of the Year: P. J. Carlesimo, Seton Hall

Other major awards 
 Frances Pomeroy Naismith Award (Best player under 6'0): Tim Hardaway, UTEP
 Robert V. Geasey Trophy (Top player in Philadelphia Big 5): Lionel Simmons, La Salle
 NIT/Haggerty Award (Top player in New York City metro area): John Morton, Seton Hall

Coaching changes 

A number of teams changed coaches during the season and after it ended.

References 

 
NCAA